General elections were held in Paraguay on 12 February 1978. Alfredo Stroessner of the Colorado Party won the presidential elections, whilst the Colorado Party won 20 of the 30 seats in the Senate and 40 of the 60 seats in the Chamber of Deputues. Voter turnout was 86%.

Results

References

Paraguay
1978 in Paraguay
Elections in Paraguay
Presidential elections in Paraguay
Alfredo Stroessner
February 1978 events in South America